Cos Cob is a neighborhood and census-designated place in the town of Greenwich, Connecticut. It is located on the Connecticut shoreline in southern Fairfield County. It had a population of 6,770 at the 2010 census.

Cos Cob is located on the western side of the mouth of the Mianus River. The American Impressionist Cos Cob Art Colony flourished in the late 19th and early 20th centuries. An offshoot of the group, the Greenwich Art Society, continues to support local artists in town.

The town of Greenwich is one political and taxing body, but consists of several distinct sections or neighborhoods, such as Banksville, Byram, Cos Cob, Glenville, Mianus,  Old Greenwich, Riverside and Greenwich (sometimes referred to as central, or downtown, Greenwich). Of these neighborhoods, three (Cos Cob, Old Greenwich, and Riverside) have separate postal names and ZIP codes.  From 1883 to 1885, the official post office name of Cos Cob was Bayport.

In 2015, Forbes ranked Cos Cob the 287th wealthiest place in the US with a median house sale price of $1,329,107.

Community facilities
The Cos Cob Library is a cultural center and community hub providing art gallery space, concert and lecture series, and free WiFi access. Although of recent construction, the building evokes Richardsonian Romanesque design and is set in a pocket park landscaped by local volunteers.
The neighborhood's zip code is 06807. It has one post office.
There are two public schools in Cos Cob: Cos Cob Elementary School, 390 pupils, and Central Middle School, 710 pupils (both as of 2010), though school boundaries cut across zip code boundaries and many students who live in Cos Cob attend other public schools in town.
Cos Cob has a fire department staffed by both full-time salaried firefighters and volunteers.
Cos Cob station is served by the New Haven Line of the Metro-North Railroad, a commuter rail service that runs between New Haven, Connecticut and New York City.

History

The community is situated on Cos Cob Harbor, a sheltered area on the north side of Long Island Sound. Cos Cob's role as a commercial shipping port, supplying potatoes and apples to New York City, disappeared with the appearance of the railroad and damming of the Mianus River. The river is now one source of the town's drinking water.

From 1883 to 1885, the official post office name of Cos Cob was Bayport.

Cos Cob gets a train for Christmas

The Cos Cob train station and the Mianus River Railroad Bridge are listed on the National Register of Historic Places.

"On Christmas Day, 1848, the last rails were laid over the Cos Cob Bridge, thereby supplying the last link needed to complete the railroad from New Haven to New York," according to the Stamford Historical Society Web site. "The first trial run was made on that day."

Editors of two Stamford newspapers reported on the event. William H. Holly, Esq., founder of the Stamford Sentinel and a guest on the first trial run, wrote: "The train had to remain at Cos Cob Bridge some three hours for the last rails to be laid over it and the delay gave ample opportunity to the people to come and witness the wonderful feat. The general impression among them seemed to be, that the first train that attempted to cross this pass would also be the last."

Edgar Hoyt, editor of the Stamford Advocate, wrote: "The citizens of the village as well as the horses, cattle, etc., were nearly frightened out of their propriety ... by such a horrible scream as was never heard to issue from any other than a metallic throat. Animals of every description went careening round the fields, snuffling the air in their terror."

Twentieth and twenty-first centuries

The coal-fired steam turbine Cos Cob Power Plant built by Westinghouse in 1907 was a Mission Style structure. It was designated a Historic Mechanical Engineering Landmark in 1982 by the ASME and the IEEE. Despite being listed on the National Register of Historic Places and local and national debate, the plant was decommissioned in 1987 and demolished in 2001.

Ernest Thompson Seton lived in Cos Cob on an estate which is now a town park. Over 75 years ago what would eventually become the Boy Scouts of America was in part founded by him here.

On June 28, 1983, a  elevated portion of Interstate 95 (the Mianus River Bridge) collapsed, killing and injuring several motorists. Interstate 95 is the principal highway between Maine and Florida, and one of the most heavily traveled roads in the country. Because the road was not fully reopened for six months, it created a bottleneck which affected the New York to Boston transportation corridor.

In 2006 NRG Energy Inc. of La Jolla, California, proposed adding additional capacity of 40 megawatts to the current 60 megawatt plant to supplement Connecticut Light and Power during peak periods in southwestern Fairfield County. Two additional jet turbines would be added to the existing plant in 2008.

Notable people
 Edwin Booth, brother of John Wilkes Booth and a famous actor of his day
 Orestes H. Caldwell, one of the first members of the Federal Radio Commission
 Gary Dell'Abate, producer for The Howard Stern Show
 Jim Himes, Democratic congressman from Connecticut's 4th congressional district.
 Finn Murphy, author of The Long Haul
 Barbara O'Neil, actress
 Anya Seton, author of historical romances
 Barbara Tuchman, historian
 Jerry Springer, TV Show Host, The Jerry Springer Show
 Frederick M. Warburg, investment banker

Places of interest
Bush-Holley House, the only National Historic Landmark in Greenwich; built in about 1730; listed in 1988
Ernest Thompson Seton House

In addition to the Bush-Holley House, these sites in Cos Cob are listed by the National Register of Historic Places:
 Mianus River Railroad Bridge, built: 1904; listed: 1987
 Cos Cob Railroad Station, built: c. 1890; listed: 1989
 Strickland Road Historic District, Strickland Road; built: c. 1730-1938; listed: 1990
 Cos Cob Power Station, Sound Shore Drive; built: 1907; listed: 1990; demolished, 2000

In popular culture
 In Season 5 of AMC's TV series Mad Men, Cos Cob became the home to character Pete Campbell and his family.
 Hollywood Golden Age film star Gene Marshall, a doll designed by artist Mel Odom, spent her formative years in Cos Cob

Library

Gallery

Notes

References

External links
Greenwich Historical Society
Greenwich Art Society
Cos Cob Library

Greenwich, Connecticut
Neighborhoods in Connecticut
Connecticut placenames of Native American origin
Census-designated places in Fairfield County, Connecticut
Census-designated places in Connecticut
Populated coastal places in Connecticut